Carolyn Farina (born 1963 or 1964)<ref name="People 1990">{{cite news |url=http://www.people.com/people/archive/article/0,,20118868,00.html |title=Meet a Miracle on 34th Street: Metropolitan'''s Carolyn Farina |work=People|date=October 1, 1990|accessdate=March 20, 2018 |quote=Farina, 26}}</ref> is an American actress best known for her starring role as Audrey Rouget in the 1990 Whit Stillman film Metropolitan.

Career

Farina was born and raised in Bayside, Queens, New York. Her father left the family very early. A shy child, she began acting classes in grade school. After high school, she had jobs as a waitress, secretary, and receptionist. She spent one semester at Queens College, and also studied acting at a variety of venues including the Lee Strasberg Institute.

She had no professional acting experience or agent when she auditioned for, and was cast as the lead in, Whit Stillman's 1990 independent film, Metropolitan. Her performance received very positive reviews, which noted her sensitivity and perceptiveness.

Apart from a brief non-speaking cameo reprisal of her character Audrey Rouget in Stillman's follow-up film The Last Days of Disco (1998), during the 1990s following her starring role in Metropolitan Farina received only small roles in two more films. These were a non-speaking role in Little Noises (1992), which was directed by Jane Spencer, and a small role as the protagonist's sister in The Age of Innocence (1993), which was directed by Martin Scorsese.

She returned to college after this period and earned a master's degree in psychology, and made a new career working as a child psychologist.

In 2011 she appeared briefly in Whit Stillman's Damsels in Distress, playing a waitress in a diner.

Filmography

References

External links
 
 "What Happened to Carolyn Farina?" by Julian O'Dea
 2015 40-minute interview featuring Whit Stillman, Carolyn Farina, and Dylan Hundley regarding Metropolitan''

1960s births
Living people
American film actresses
Actresses from New York City
People from Bayside, Queens
20th-century American actresses
21st-century American actresses